Tawûsî Melek (romanized: Tawisi Malak), also spelled Melekê Tawûs and Tawûsê Melek, translated in English as Peacock Angel, is one of the central figures of the Yazidi religion. In Yazidi creation stories, before the creation of this world, God created seven Divine Beings, of whom Tawûsî Melek was appointed as the leader. God assigned all of the world's affairs to these seven Divine Beings, also often referred to as the Seven Angels or heft sirr ("the Seven Mysteries").

In Yazidi beliefs, there is one God, who created Seven Divine beings, the leader of whom is Tawûsî Melek, the Lord of this World, who is responsible for all that happens on this world, both good and bad. According to religious tradition, the nature, with its phenomena of light and darkness, is from one source, which is the Lord of this World, Tawûsî Melek. Qewl passages emphasize Tawûsî Melek's power on the earth, in the sky, sea, on the mountains, and their residents, that is, his power exists in all parts of nature, whether celestial or terrestrial.

Religious significance

Tawûsî Melek in Yazidi beliefs and mythology 

The Yazidis consider Tawûsî Melek an emanation of God who is a good, benevolent angel and leader of the archangels, who was entrusted to take care of the world after he passed a test and created the cosmos from the Cosmic egg. Yazidis believe that Tawûsî Melek is not a source of evil or wickedness. They consider him to be the leader of the archangels, not a fallen nor a disgraced angel, but an emanation of God himself. The Yazidis believe that the founder or reformer of their religion, Sheikh Adi Ibn Musafir, was an incarnation of Tawûsî Melek.

In Yazidi religious folk beliefs, Tawûsî Melek is described as eternal and an eternal light (Tawûsî Melek herhey ye û nûra baqî ye), and in Yazidi mythology, when Tawûsî Melek descended to earth, the seven colours of the rainbow transformed into a seven-coloured bird, the peacock, which flew around every part of earth to bless it, and its last resting place was in Lalish. Hence, in Yazidi mythology, the rainbow is linked with Tawûsî Melek and it is believed that he shows his blessing with the sign of rainbow.

The first Wednesday of Nîsan (Eastern April) every year is believed to coincide with Tawûsî Melek's descending to the earth as light for the renewal of life on earth, adorning of the nature and renewing of the year; therefore, it became a holy day and is the day on which the Yazidi New Year (Sersal) takes place. On the eve of the feast, 365/366 lamps are lit as the symbol of the descending of Tawûsî Melek to the earth. This number also corresponds to the number of the days in the year.

Yazidi accounts of the creation differ significantly from those of the Abrahamic religions (Judaism, Christianity, and Islam), since they are derived from the Ancient Mesopotamian and Indo-Iranian traditions; therefore, Yazidi cosmogony is closer to those of Ancient Iranian religions, Yarsanism, and Zoroastrianism. Yazidi people believe that God first created Tawûsî Melek from his own illumination (Ronahî) and the other six archangels were created later. God ordered Tawûsî Melek not to bow to other beings. Then God created the other archangels and ordered them to bring him dust (Ax) from the Earth (Erd) and build the body of Adam. Then God gave life to Adam from his own breath and instructed all archangels to bow to Adam. The archangels obeyed, except for Tawûsî Melek. In answer to God, Tawûsî Melek replied,

Then God praised him and made him the leader of all angels and his deputy on the Earth.

Hence, the Yazidis believe that Tawûsî Melek is the representative of God on the face of the Earth. Yazidis argue that the order to bow to Adam was only a test for Tawûsî Melek, since if God commands anything then it must happen (Bibe, dibe). In other words: God could have made him submit to Adam, but gave Tawûsî Melek the choice as a test. They believe that their respect and praise for Tawûsî Melek is a way to acknowledge his majestic and sublime nature. This idea is called Zanista Ciwaniyê (Knowledge of the Sublime). Sheikh Adî observed the story of Tawûsî Melek and believed in him.

Symbolism of the Peacock in religious life 
In Yazidism, the Peacock, which Tawûsî Melek is symbolised with, is believed to represent the diversity of the World, and the colourfulness of the Peacock's feathers is considered to represent of all the colours of the nature. The feathers of the peacock also symbolize sunrays, from which comes light, luminosity and brightness, and the peacock opening its feathers of its tail in a circular shape symbolizes the sunrise. Consequently, due to its holiness, Yazidis are not allowed to hunt and eat the peacock, ill-treat it and utter bad words about it. Images of the peacock are also found drawn around the sanctuary of Lalish and on other Yazidi shrines and holy sites, homes, as well as religious, social, cultural and academic centres.

In Yarsanism 
In Yarsanism, a religion that shares many similarities with Yazidism dating back to pre-Islam, there is also a figure referred to as Malak Tawus. Although the older Yaresan texts use this name for Satan, in religion exists identification tied to the names of angels during various dowres (cycles), which denotes range of concepts. Malak Tawus is believed to be "pure and without sin, above and free of any bad actions, obedient and devoted to God and consisting of light." According to Yarsani doctrine, during the dowre of Shari'at, in which one is being guided by Islamic Law, Malak Tawus was labelled as Sheytan, whereas in the dowre of Haqiqat (Truth), Malak Tawus is called Dawud, who is one of the seven holy Beings in Yarsanism that are referred to as the Haft Tan. The Yaresan of the Kermanshah region use the name „Malek Tavus“, i. e. the Peackock Angel to designate Satan.

The term dowre may refer to a period of time that started with the Essences (zāt) of the Divine and of members of the two Heptads manifesting or incarnating themselves as humans. It also refers to a stage in humanity's religious development. The first and initial dowre was the stage of Shari'at, where the Islamic Law was or is in charge and guiding everyone. This dowre is believed to have begun at creation and concluded with Muhammed, the Truth (Haqiqat) is thought to have existed during this stage, but had not yet been perceived. Following the dowre of Shari'at were the intermediate dowres of Tariqat, i.e. the 'Path' of a mystical Order, and Ma'refat, i.e. Esoteric Knowledge. The former was marked by the development of mystical brotherhoods that allowed people to start learning about esoteric truth. These stages were succeeded by the present dowre of Haqiqat, which is marked by Sultan Sahak's arrival. The dowre of Haqiqat is the phase of development in which the advanced mystic fully has perceived the esoteric Truth. Yarsanis are thought to be living in this dowre, however, the same is not true for all humans, and most outsiders are still believed to remain in the dowre of Shari'at or the intermediate dowres of Tariqat and Ma'refat.

Accusations of alleged devil-worship

In the Yazidi myth of creation, Tawûsî Melek refused to bow before Adam, the first human, when God ordered the Seven Angels to do so. The command was actually a test, meant to determine which of these angels was most loyal to God by not prostrating themselves to someone other than their creator. This belief has been linked by some people to the Islamic mythological narrative on Iblis, who also refused to prostrate to Adam, despite God's express command to do so. Because of this similarity to the Islamic tradition of Iblis, Muslims and followers of other Abrahamic religions have erroneously associated and identified the Peacock Angel with their own conception of the unredeemed evil spirit Satan, a misconception which has incited centuries of violent religious persecution of the Yazidis as "devil-worshippers". Persecution of Yazidis has continued in their home communities within the borders of modern Iraq.

Since the late 16th century, Muslims have accused Yazidis of devil-worship due to the similarity between the Islamic mythological narrative on Iblis and the account of Tawûsî Melek's refusal to bow to Adam. Whereas Muslims revile Iblis for refusing to submit to God and bow to Adam, believing that his defiance caused him to fall from God's grace, Yazidis revere Tawûsî Melek for loyalty towards God and believe that God's command to Tawûsî Melek was a test to see who is truly devoted to God alone. This narrative led to many misinterpretations, also made by Western scholars, who interpreted the Yazidi faith through their own cultural influences. Further accusations derived from narratives attributed to Melek Taûs, which are actually foreign to Yazidism, probably introduced by either Muslims in the 9th century or Christian missionaries in the 20th century. Accusations of devil-worship fueled centuries of violent religious persecution, which have led Yazidi communities to concentrate in remote mountainous regions of northwestern Iraq. The Yazidi taboo against the Arabic word Shaitan (الشیطان) and on words containing the consonants š (sh) and t/ṭ have been used to suggest a connection between Tawûsî Melek and Iblis, although no evidence exists to suggest that Yazidis worship Tawûsî Melek as the same figure.

Yazidis, however, believe Tawûsî Melek is not a source of evil or wickedness. They consider him to be the leader of the archangels, not a fallen angel. Yazidis argue that the order to bow to Adam was only a test for Tawûsî Melek, since if God commands anything then it must happen. In other words, God could have made him submit to Adam, but gave Tawûsî Melek the choice as a test: God had directed him not to bow to any other being, and his refusal of the later order to bow to Adam was thus obedience to God's original command. In Mishefa Resh, Tawûsî Melek is equated with Ezrayil or Ezazil.

See also

 Sultan Ezid
 List of angels in theology
 List of Yazidi holy figures
 List of Yazidi holy places
 List of Yazidi settlements
 Yazidism
 Yazidis
 Yarsanism

Citations

General bibliography

External links 
 
The Yaresan : a sociological, historical and religio-historical study of a Kurdish community / M. Reza Hamzeh'ee. Berlin : Schwarz, 1990

Archangels
Birds in mythology
Individual angels
Middle Eastern mythology
Mythological galliforms
Peafowl
Yazidi mythology
Kurdish words and phrases